Michael Waugh may refer to:

Mike Waugh (1955–2014), Republican State Senator for Pennsylvania's 28th district
Michael Waugh (artist), Brooklyn-based artist